Viverra leakeyi, also known as Leakey's civet or the giant civet, is an extinct species of civet. Its fossils have been found in Africa, from Langebaanweg, Ethiopia, Tanzania, and the Omo Valley.

Description
V. leakeyi looked physically similar to living Asiatic civet species but is thought to be more closely related to the African Civettictis civetta due to their location.

Diet and behavior
This civet's  dentition indicates it more than likely was strictly carnivorous, in comparison, living civet species are observed to be omnivorous instead. Because of V. leakeyi's size and dentition, the living animal is thought to be an active predator.

References

Viverrids
Miocene mammals of Africa
Pliocene mammals of Africa
Pleistocene mammals of Africa
Miocene carnivorans
Fossil taxa described in 1982